The 1909 Chattanooga Moccasins football team represented the University of Chattanooga as an independent during the 1909 college football season.

Schedule

References

Chattanooga
Chattanooga Mocs football seasons
Chattanooga Moccasins football